Tet Htun Aung (born 16 June 1956) is a Burmese politician who currently serves as a Regional Hluttaw MP for Pauktaw Township No. 2 constituency and an Amyotha Hluttaw MP for Rakhine State No. 2 Constituency. He is a member of Rakhine National Party.

Early life and education
He was born on 16 June 1956 in Rakhine State, Burma (Myanmar). He had served as Secretary of Arakan National Party Pauktaw Township and as Central Executive Committee of Finance.

Political career
He is a member of the Rakhine National Party. In the 2015 Myanmar general election, he was elected as an Amyotha Hluttaw MP and elected representative from Rakhine State No. 2 parliamentary constituency. He also serves as the Regional Hluttaw MP for Pauktaw Township No. 2 constituency.

References

National League for Democracy politicians
1956 births
Living people
People from Rakhine State